Katheru is a part of Greater Rajamahendravaram Municipal Corporation (GRMC). It was merged into Greater Rajamahendravaram Municipal Corporation (GRMC) on 28 January 2020. It also forms a part of Godavari Urban Development Authority.

References 

Rajahmundry